Hughes STEM High School is a public high school located in Cincinnati, Ohio.  It is part of the Cincinnati Public Schools.

History
The first Hughes High School was established in 1853 on property on Fifth and Mound streets.

The school owes its name to Thomas Hughes, an Englishman and shoemaker, who, by his will, dated December, 1826, left his property for a high school, which was built in 1853 at a cost of $23,375.

Pre-Hughes Center
Thomas Hughes' vision, wherein he had bequeathed his land to be “applied to the maintenance and support of a school or schools in the City of Cincinnati for the education of poor destitute children whose parents or guardians are unable to pay for their schooling” came into fruition almost 30 years later. The first graduating class consisted of six girls and four boys. The school thereafter served a predominantly poor population of students.

Hughes Center
Hughes Center was a team-based magnet school dedicated to the Paideia philosophy. The Paideia philosophy is based upon the belief that all students can be successful in a rigorous college preparatory curriculum.

Programs available at Hughes Center included:
Zoo Academy (a program offered in association with the Cincinnati Zoo and Botanical Garden)
High School for Teaching and Technology
High School for the Health Professions
High School for the Communication Profession
Cincinnati Academy for Mathematics and Science (CAMAS) High School
The Paideia High School

The last principal of Hughes Center was Dr. Virginia Rhodes and the school program was closed with the graduating class of 2012.

Hughes STEM
Hughes STEM saw its first students in 2009. In response to national initiatives for STEM education in America's public schools, the school curriculum was redesigned to focus on related career fields. A NSF grant aimed at creating scalable models of STEM schools paid for much of the upstart and transition costs, many of which were related to technology equipment acquisition.

In 2011-2012 Hughes gained an 8th grade class and became a fully 7th-12th grade school the following school year.

Academics
The school is composed of four pathways:
 Health and Bioscience 
 Engineering 
 Programming and Software Development
 Zoo Academy located at the Cincinnati Zoo and Botanical Garden

Extra-Curriculars
The school is host to a robotics team, an academic team, and a science club.

Athletics
Hughes is home to a number of teams for boys and girls, most of which compete in the CMAC. Those teams include football, basketball, volleyball, baseball, softball, soccer (for girls), wrestling, cheerleading, dance, and track.

Ohio High School Athletic Association State Championships

 Boys Baseball - 1938,1949 
 Boys Swimming – 1930 
 Boys Golf – 1928 
 Boys Track and Field – 1925

Notable alumni

Wilbur G. Adam, painter and illustrator
Alex Bannister, football player
Jerome Davis, football player
Andre Frazier, football player 
Moses J. Gries, rabbi 
Louis Grossmann, rabbi 
Libby Holman, singer and stage actress
Loretta Cessor Manggrum, composer
Bob Quick, basketball player
Bob Smith, football player
Joseph Baermann Strauss, Chief Engineer of Golden Gate Bridge
Louis Wolsey, rabbi

References

External links

District Website
Hughes STEM High School Homepage

Cincinnati Public Schools
High schools in Hamilton County, Ohio
Public high schools in Ohio
Magnet schools in Ohio